2014 Ukrainian election may refer to:

2014 Ukrainian presidential election
2014 Ukrainian parliamentary election
2014 Ukrainian local elections